American Gong is the eighth album by Portland based indie rock band Quasi.  It was released on February 23, 2010, on Kill Rock Stars.  It was released in Europe by Domino Records. A deluxe 2-CD version of the album exists, featuring a compilation disc entitled So Far So Good: A Quasi Anthology.

Track listing

So Far So Good: A Quasi Anthology track listing

Personnel
 Sam Coomes – vocals, keyboards, guitar, producer
 Janet Weiss – drums, background vocals, producer
 Joanna Bolme – bass, producer
 Steve Fisk – mixing
 Dave Fridmann – mixing
 Johanna Jackson – artwork
 Chris Johanson – artwork
 Tucker Martine – mixing
 Roger Seibel – mastering
 Kendra Wright – recording engineer

References

2010 albums
Domino Recording Company albums
Quasi albums
Kill Rock Stars albums